BornHack (a portmanteau of Bornholm and hack) is an annual hacker camp on the Danish island of Funen, near Gelsted. From 2016 to 2018, it was organized on Bornholm.

History 
In 2021, the BornHack electronic badge was based on a perfboard due to the chip shortage. The 2021 camp was also captured on Google Maps arial pictures.

In 2022, Thomas Flummer developed a badge based on the RP2040, for which software can be developed in CircuitPython.

During BornHack there is a field specifically designed for loud noise, with a noise barrier made from soil. A Dutch hacker brought an old civil defense siren for testing purposes. Within a few minutes, four separate phone calls were made from houses in a large distance from BornHack to the Danish police.

See also 
 EMF Camp
 SHA 2017 
 CCCamp

References

External links

 Photos on Flickr
BornHack 2022 (recorded talks: media.ccc.de)
BornHack 2021 (recorded talks: media.ccc.de and youtube.com)
BornHack 2020 (recorded talks: youtube.com)
BornHack 2019 (recorded talks: youtube.com)
BornHack 2018 (recorded talks: youtube.com)
BornHack 2017 (recorded talks: youtube.com)
BornHack 2016 (recorded talks: youtube.com)

Hacker culture
Hacker conventions
Recurring events established in 2016